German submarine U-103 was a Type IXB U-boat of Nazi Germany's Kriegsmarine that operated during World War II. She was one of the most successful boats in the entire war, sinking  of Allied shipping in 11 patrols, in a career lasting more than four years.

U-103 was laid down on 6 September 1939 at DeSchiMAG AG Weser in Bremen as yard number 966. She was launched on 12 April 1940 and commissioned on 5 July under the command of Korvettenkapitän Victor Schütze. After her warm-up, (designed to give her an opportunity to train and repair minor faults), she was deployed into the North Atlantic in September 1940 and saw overwhelming success, sinking 46 ships and damaging three other vessels.

Design
German Type IXB submarines were slightly larger than the original German Type IX submarines, later designated IXA. U-103 had a displacement of  when at the surface and  while submerged. She had two shafts and two  propellers.

U-103 was fitted with six  torpedo tubes (four fitted at the bow and two at the stern), 22 torpedoes, one  SK C/32 naval gun, 180 rounds, and a  SK C/30 as well as a  C/30 anti-aircraft gun. The boat had a complement of forty-eight.

Service history

First patrol
The boat entered the Atlantic via the gap between the Faroe and Shetland Islands. Her first victory was sinking Nina Borthen in mid-ocean on 6 October. After being hit by a torpedo, the ship developed a list, which the crew corrected. Two more torpedoes hit the ship, which also caused a list. Another torpedo hit broke the vessel in two and she sank with all hands.

On 9 October, U-103 sank Zanes Gounaris and damaged Graigwen and Delphin. Delphin sank the next day.

U-103 docked at her new base, Lorient on the French Atlantic coast, on 19 October.

Second patrol

The submarine returned to Lorient on 12 December.

Third patrol
On 13 February 1941 Arthur F. Corwin was damaged by U-103, and sunk by  later that day. On 19 February U-103 sank the Norwegian motor ship Benjamin Franklin. The Flower-class corvette HMS Pimpernel rescued seven survivors, and landed them at Liverpool. The Egyptian steamship Memphis rescued 29 of her crew, but on 28 February Memphis suffered engine failure and sank with all hands.

Fourth patrol
U-103s fourth patrol was off the coast of West Africa. At 103 days, it was her longest patrol. The ship sank with all hands in one minute.

U-103 sank Samsø, Wray Castle, Surat and Dunkwa in the first week of May. When Dunkwa sank, U-103s crew saw that there were 39 survivors in one lifeboat. The U-boat crew righted another boat and provided drinking water.

On 25 May, she sank the cargo ship Radames off the coast of Liberia. The sinking of the Radames was filmed, and is often shown on documentaries about the Battle of the Atlantic.

U-103 sank another seven ships off the African coast before returning to Lorient on 12 July.

Fifth patrol
U-103s fifth patrol was in the North Atlantic. It sank Niceto de Larrinaga, Edward Blyden and Lapwing west of the Canary Islands on 22 September 1941.

Sixth patrol
The U-boat's sixth patrol was part of Operation Drumbeat, off the Atlantic coast of the USA. The torpedo hit set the ship on fire but wave action soon extinguished it. Using her deck gun, U-103 fired 83 rounds, scoring 17 hits and reigniting the fire. She fired a further two torpedoes. The second missed, but the third detonated the tanker's cargo, sending flames  into the air.

U-103 also sank San Gil on 4 February, and both India Arrow and  the next day.

Seventh patrol
U-103 began her seventh patrol by leaving Lorient on 15 April 1942. She sank Stanbank northeast of Bermuda on 5 May. She continued to the Caribbean and the Gulf of Mexico, where she sank another eight merchant ships that month. U-103 returned to Lorient on 22 June.

Eighth patrol
She captured Henry Stanleys Master. He was eventually sent to the Milag Nord internment camp for merchant seamen.

U-103 also damaged Horata north of the Azores on 13 December.

Ninth and tenth patrols
On her ninth patrol U-103 sank no ships. She searched the Atlantic off Spain as far west as the Azores and as far south as Morocco, but found no convoys. Having left Lorient on 7 February 1943, she returned there on 26 March.

On U-103S tenth patrol, on 27 April a Vickers Wellington of No. 172 Squadron RAF equipped with a Leigh Light attacked her. The aircraft found the U-boat with its radar, and dropped six depth charges, but caused no damage. A Whitley bomber of No. 10 OTU (Operational Training Unit) attacked U-103 on 22 May. U-103 returned fire, preventing the aircraft from dropping its depth charges. Plane and submarine both returned safely to their bases.

11th patrol
U-103s last operational patrol was officially divided into two parts; the first of which saw her arrive in Brest in France only two days after her departure from Lorient. She then returned to the west African coast but without repeating her earlier success. She sailed to Norway via a reverse in the course of her first patrol and arrived at Bergen on 1 January 1944.

Fate
U-103 left Bergen on 3 January 1944 and reached Kiel on the 7th. In March she was taken out of service and used as a Schulboot (training boat). She went from Gotenhafen to Hamburg in January 1945, and in April from Hamburg back to Kiel. On 3 May 1945 she was scuttled at Kiel.

Wolfpacks
U-103 took part in nine wolfpacks, namely:
 Störtebecker (5 – 7 November 1941) 
 Streitaxt (29 October – 2 November 1942) 
 Schlagetot (9 – 21 November 1942) 
 Westwall (21 November – 16 December 1942) 
 Robbe (16 February – 12 March 1943) 
 Wohlgemut (12 – 19 March 1943) 
 Amsel 4 (4 – 6 May 1943) 
 Rhein (7 – 10 May 1943) 
 Elbe 2 (10 – 14 May 1943)

Summary of raiding history

See also
 List of successful U-boats

References

Notes

Citations

Bibliography

External links

 uboataces.com webpage with insignia for U-103

German Type IX submarines
U-boats commissioned in 1940
U-boats sunk in 1945
World War II submarines of Germany
World War II shipwrecks in the Baltic Sea
1940 ships
Ships built in Bremen (state)
U-boats sunk by Canadian aircraft
Maritime incidents in April 1945